Ihor (Igor) Vitaliyovych Radivilov (born 19 October 1992) is a Ukrainian gymnast and three-time Olympian, having competed at the 2012, 2016, and 2020 Olympic Games. Although he competes on all apparatuses, he is best known as a vault and rings specialist.

Personal life 
Radivilov was born on 19 October 1992 in Mariupol, eastern Ukraine. On 4 September 2016, he married Ukrainian gymnast Angelina Kysla.

Career

2012–2016 
Radivilov won silver medal in vault at the 2012 European Championships in Montpellier, France. He competed for the national team at the 2012 Summer Olympics in the men's artistic team all-around and the men's vault. He earned a bronze medal in the vault final at 2012 Summer Olympics with a score of 16.316. He also finished in fourth place in the team all-around final as part of the Ukrainian team along with Mykola Kuksenkov, Oleg Stepko, Vitalii Nakonechnyi and Oleg Vernyayev. Ukraine also takes pride on Radivilov being their first Olympic medalist born in the post-Soviet era.

Radivilov won gold in rings at the 2013 European Championships. At the 2013 Summer Universiade in Kazan, he and the Ukrainian team (Vernyayev, Stepko, Petro Pakhnyuk and Maksym Semiankiv) finished second in the team final. He won bronze in the rings and vault finals behind Russian gymnast Denis Ablyazin.

On May 19–25, 2014, at the 2014 European Championships in Sofia. Radivilov contributed scores of 14.266 (floor), 15.300 (rings) and 14.700 (vault), helping his country win the team bronze medal with a total score of 262.087 points, behind Great Britain. In event finals, Radivilov won the silver medal on vault (15.050) behind Ablyazin again.

At the 2016 Summer Olympics in Rio de Janeiro, Radivilov debuted a new vault in the event final–a handspring triple front somersault–which had the highest difficulty score of 7.0. Although he sat it down on landing, his feet (not pelvis) did touch the ground first, and thus considered a successful attempt when a score was given, which also subsequently contributed to the International Gymnastics Federation (FIG) in formally naming the skill after him, the Radivilov. However, due to the potential danger of associated injuries to gymnasts with the training and/or competing of this skill, the FIG has since officially banned it from competition after the Olympics and removed it from the next 2017–2020 Code of Points for men's artistic gymnastics.

2020 
In March Radivilov competed at the Baku World Cup and qualified to the vault final in third place; however event finals were canceled due to the COVID-19 pandemic in Azerbaijan.  The global COVID-19 pandemic caused numerous competitions to be cancelled or postponed, including the 2020 Olympic Games.

In October Radivilov returned to international competition at the Szombathely Challenge Cup where he finished second on rings and first on vault.  In December he competed at an attendance-reduced European Championships where only ten nations sent a full team.  The Ukrainian team of Radivilov, Vladyslav Hryko, Petro Pakhniuk, Roman Vashchenko, and Yevgen Yudenkov bested the Turkish team to win gold in the team competition.  Individually Radivilov placed first on vault, winning his first European title on the event, and third on rings behind İbrahim Çolak and Vinzenz Höck.

2021 
Radivilov competed at the European Championships where he defended his title on vault; additionally he placed sixth on rings.  He competed at the Doha World Cup and Osijek Challenge Cup where he placed second and first on vault respectively.  He represented Ukraine at the 2020 Olympic Games in Tokyo, Japan alongside Illia Kovtun, Petro Pakhnyuk, and Yevhen Yudenkov.  They finished seventh in the team final.  Radivilov competed at the 2021 World Championships but did not qualify to any event finals.

Eponymous skills
Radivilov has one "inactive" eponymous skill, but it is one that remains officially recognised by the (FIG) nonetheless. Even though he was ruled to have legally completed the skill in competition and subsequently given naming credit for it, his attempt at it during the 2016 Summer Olympics in Rio de Janeiro on the individual vault event did not go as smoothly as he would have liked. His attempt at the mindbogglingly difficult handspring triple front tucked somersault on vault—now officially known as the Radivilov—assigned the highest difficulty of 7.0, ended with him appearing to have landed the skill on his back, almost received a zero score if that was the case, but since video reply did show him (barely) touch the mat with his feet first, he had thus completed a legal vault and was therefore given a score, albeit with a very low execution component due to his fall. However, because Radivilov was then awarded a score to a new original skill, he was also simultaneously deemed to have successfully completed the skill in competition, which led to the skill being automatically named after him. Unfortunately, the skill has since been banned from competition entirely after the Olympics, and removed from the next Code of Points (CoP). The FIG has determined that the risk of injury when training and/or competing the skill is just too great for them not to intervene officially. The difficulty score listed below reflected the FIG's 2013-2016 CoP, which was when the skill was first successfully completed in competition, but then not updated into later quads due to its subsequent ban not long after the skill was originated.

Competitive history

References

External links
 

1992 births
Sportspeople from Mariupol
Living people
Olympic gymnasts of Ukraine
Gymnasts at the 2012 Summer Olympics
Gymnasts at the 2016 Summer Olympics
Olympic bronze medalists for Ukraine
Olympic medalists in gymnastics
Medalists at the 2012 Summer Olympics
Ukrainian male artistic gymnasts
European champions in gymnastics
Gymnasts at the 2015 European Games
Gymnasts at the 2019 European Games
European Games medalists in gymnastics
European Games silver medalists for Ukraine
European Games bronze medalists for Ukraine
Medalists at the World Artistic Gymnastics Championships
Universiade medalists in gymnastics
Universiade silver medalists for Ukraine
Universiade bronze medalists for Ukraine
Medalists at the 2013 Summer Universiade
Medalists at the 2015 Summer Universiade
Medalists at the 2017 Summer Universiade
Gymnasts at the 2020 Summer Olympics